Prive is the first EP by the Dominican artist Juan Luis Guerra and 4:40. It was released on December 25, 2020, and was distributed Universal Music Latin. It consisted in three new versions of Guerra's previous hits Las Avispas, Ojala Que Llueva Cafe and Pedir Su Mano with acoustic arrangements and two new songs, Pambiche Pa` Mi Novia which was the lead single and "Donde Naces Tus Besos". The EP production consisted in an intimate sound based and oriented on Son and a slow version of merengue called Pambiche and with elements of jazz, blues, bossa nova and classical music along with the use of instruments piano, guitar, guira, vibraphone and saxophone. Privé was produced by Juan Luis Guerra and co-produced by his longtime arranger Janina Rosado.

The release of “Privé” was accompanied by a TV Christmas special and livestream in which Guerra performed the five songs and recorded on the backyard of his house in his natal Santo Domingo, Dominican Republic, it was directed and produced by Guerra's own son, Jean Guerra. It was later upload to digital platforms.

Privé received critical acclaim by the fans and critics and was nominated for Album of the Year at the 22nd Annual Latin Grammy Awards and the lead single, Pambiche Pa` Mi Novia was nominated for Best Tropical Song. Eventually, It won Best Traditional Pop Vocal Album in the same ceremony and Best Arrangement for the prive version of Ojala Que Llueva Cafe.

Tracklist

References 

Juan Luis Guerra EPs
2020 EPs